Bob LaPoint (born 25 May 1955) is an American former professional water skier. During his career he set the world record on five occasions and won 15 major championships. In 2006 he was inducted into the Water Ski Hall of Fame. He is the younger brother of water skier Kris LaPoint.

Biography 
Bob LaPoint was born in Castro Valley, California in 1955, two years after his brother Kris. He attended A.B. Morris Middle School and Castro Valley High School. Following his parents' divorce he moved to Novato, California where he graduated from San Marin High School.

In 1967, at the age of 12, he won the slalom and overall categories in the junior division at the U.S. National Water Ski Championships, beginning what would be highly successful career. He would later go on to win 15 major championships and set five world records.

LaPoint now works for HO Sports as a water ski designer, a job he has had since 2007. He lives in Truckee, California with his wife Erika, with whom he has had two children, Kristian and Simone. He has two other children, Kaci and Kara, from a previous marriage.

Achievements

References 

1955 births
Living people
American water skiers
Male professional water skiers
People from Castro Valley, California
Sportspeople from Castro Valley, California
People from DeLeon Springs, Florida
World Games gold medalists
Competitors at the 1981 World Games